The Second Battle of Massawa (also known as Operation Fenkil and as the Fenkil offensive) took place in 1990 in and around the coastal city of Massawa in Eritrea. The offensive was conducted by both land and sea units of the Eritrean People's Liberation Front (EPLF) against the Ethiopian Army.

Battle
Beginning on February 8, 1990 the EPLF forces began the offensive by cutting off the critical supply route from the Asmara garrison. The surprise attack stunned the Ethiopian military and by the following afternoon the EPLF forces were in the suburbs of Massawa. On the third day of the offensive, February 11, 1990, the Eritrean forces captured the Ethiopian naval base near the town. The only remaining portion of the city to rid of Ethiopian troops were the islands. 

To achieve this the Eritrean forces used their nascent naval forces (mostly small gunboats) to attack from by sea during an artillery barrage. Using this artillery fire the Eritrean armor moved onto the causeways that connected the islands with the mainland. The first of these tanks were destroyed by the Ethiopian garrison, however, they were eventually overcome by the EPLF. After this defeat the remainder of the Ethiopian forces retreated to Ghinda. This battle was what is known as a major occurrence in Ethiopia.

Even after the loss of Massawa, the Ethiopians continued their aerial bombardment of the city. The civilian population was hardest hit as the EPLF forces had followed the Ethiopian troops to Ghinda. Notable of this bombardment was that napalm and cluster bombs were used.

Commemoration

The battle was commemorated by a memorial of three tanks in War Memory Square near the Massawa city centre on Tualud Island by the entrance to the causeway to the mainland. In 2004 on the fourteenth anniversary of the battle, Eritrea issued a set of two stamps and a three-stamp minisheet honoring the "Liberation of Massawa". Pictured on the 40c was the tank memorial with fountain, on the 50c was a speedboat (gunboat) with soldiers.

See also
 Battle of Massawa (1977)
 Eritrean War of Independence

References

External links
"Eritrea's Operation Fenkil: Final Assault on Massawa with Speed Boats 1990" Google video

Massawa
1990 in Ethiopia
Massawa (1990)
Conflicts in 1990
Massawa (1990)
February 1990 events in Africa